Yuri Nikolaevich Krylov (b. March 11, 1930 in Krasnogorsk, Soviet Union - d. November 4, 1979) was an ice hockey player who played in the Soviet Hockey League.  He played for HC Dynamo Moscow.  He was inducted into the Russian and Soviet Hockey Hall of Fame in 1954.

External links
Russian and Soviet Hockey Hall of Fame bio

1930 births
1979 deaths
HC Dynamo Moscow players
Ice hockey people from Moscow
Ice hockey players at the 1956 Winter Olympics
Medalists at the 1956 Winter Olympics
Olympic gold medalists for the Soviet Union
Olympic ice hockey players of the Soviet Union
Olympic medalists in ice hockey